"Harch" is the command issued by the Drum Major of a marching band, or by a Sergeant in charge of assembled troops, to move forwards upon the left foot. The command most commonly issued is "For'd, Harch" meaning for the entire group to move forwards as one body.  "For'd" is the attention-getting and directive part of the command; "Harch" is the executive part of the command.
   
The term "harch", rather than "march" is used, as the latter term may easily be scattered by noise. For similar reasons, the contraction "for'd" is (preferably) used rather than "forward."  Also, the term march may be confused with a number of other commands that include this word, e.g., "To the Right Flank, Harch."  

Marching bands